Henry Toulmin may refer to:

 Harry Toulmin (Unitarian minister) (1766–1823), Unitarian minister and politician
 Henry Hayman Toulmin (1807–1871), British ship owner

See also
 Harry Toulmin (disambiguation)